Pepijn Doesburg (born 17 January, 2001) is a Dutch footballer who plays for FC Dordrecht in the Eerste divisie as an attacker. He is the grandson of Eredivisie record appearance holder Pim Doesburg.

Career
Doesburg played in the youth teams of TOGB and Feyenoord before joining Sparta Rotterdam. In June 2022 Doesburg began training  with Dordrecht ahead of the 2022-23 season. He made his Eerste divisie debut in August 2022 against Roda JC. He scored his first Eerste divisie goal against PEC Zwolle in October 2022.

Personal life
His grandfather is former Dutch international footballer Pim Doesburg, who holds the record for Eredivisie appearances of 687. Unlike his grandfather tho Pepjin explained he couldn’t be a goalkeeper as he was useless with his hands. He credited his grandfather with passing on advice around the mental toughness required to play professionally which helped Pepjin with the mentality required to help overcome injuries in his career.

References

External links

2001 births
Living people
Dutch footballers